Dorcadion heydenii is a species of beetle in the family Cerambycidae. It was described by Kraatz in 1870. It is known from Spain.

See also 
Dorcadion

References

heydenii
Beetles described in 1870